Las Lajas   is a corregimiento in San Félix District, Chiriquí Province, Panama. It is the seat of San Félix District. Its population as of 1990 was 2,218; its population as of 2000 was 1,191.

References

Corregimientos of Chiriquí Province